Phycodes minor is a moth in the family Brachodidae. It was described by Frederic Moore in 1881. It is found in south and south-east Asia.

References

Brachodidae
Moths described in 1881